James David Sullivan (January 6, 1968 - November 12, 2011) was a Canadian curler from Saint John, New Brunswick. He was a renowned curler, being skip of the Jim Sullivan Rink which captured the 1987 Canadian Junior Curling Championships for New Brunswick, and the 1988 World Junior Curling Championships. In 1990, Sullivan and his team were the silver medallists at the Labatt Brier. Sullivan continued to be active in curling, being a member of Thistle St. Andrews Curling Club, and an Honorary Life Member of the Capital Winter Club in Fredericton.

Sullivan experienced depression and died by suicide in 2011.

Sullivan's cousin was another curler, Charlie Sullivan, as was his uncle, Charlie Sullivan, Sr.

References

External links
World Curling Federation profile

1968 births
2011 suicides
Curlers from New Brunswick
Sportspeople from Saint John, New Brunswick
Suicides in Canada